Ijjeh (also idjeh, ijeh) is a Middle Eastern egg dish that comes in various forms and is prepared in various ways. In most varieties, the eggs are mixed with cream and with herbs and vegetables including parsley, mint, and sometimes leeks or potatoes, or even ground beef or lamb. Cooking methods include oven baking (as a casserole) and skillet cooking (as single-person omelettes or latkes).

References

Middle Eastern cuisine